Steel Fury: Kharkov 1942 is a World War 2 tank simulation computer game, set during the Kharkov offensive of 1942. It was made by the Ukrainian game developer team Graviteam and Russian developer Discus Games.

2007 video games
Video games developed in Ukraine
Video games set in the Soviet Union
Tank simulation video games
Video games about Nazi Germany
Windows games
Windows-only games
Lighthouse Interactive games
World War II video games
Video games set in 1942
Video games set in Ukraine
The game was released in Russia in November 2007 (Buka). An English version of the game was released in 2008. The publisher was the now defunct  Lighthouse Interactive Game Publishing.